Neoscona oaxacensis, known as western spotted orbweaver and zig-zag spider, is a species of spider in the family Araneidae. It is distributed in the Americas, from Kansas and California south to Venezuela and Peru, including the Galápagos Islands.

Description
Neoscona oaxacensis is a relatively large spider, females being about 9–18 mm (0.35–0.7 in) long overall, with a carapace of about 4–8 mm (0.15–0.3 in) long by 3–6 mm (0.1–0.25 in) wide. Males are smaller, being about 6–13 mm (0.25–0.5 in) long overall, with a carapace of about 3–6 mm (0.1–0.25 in) long by 3–5 mm (0.1–0.2 in) wide. Specimens from the Galápagos are among the largest found. The black-and-white pattern on the upper (dorsal) surface of the abdomen is considered to be distinctive. South American specimens have a more slender abdomen than North American ones, with a more distinct light central band, which has a wavy border. Females have an epigyne appearing 2.5 times as long as wide when viewed from the rear. Males have a palp with an S-shaped conductor.

Taxonomy
The species was first described by Eugen Keyserling in 1863, as Epeira oaxacensis. The specific name oaxacensis refers to Keyserling's description of its origin as Oaxaca, Mexico. (The Latin ending -ensis is commonly added to a place name to mean "originating from".) The genus Epeira was divided by Eugène Simon in 1864, one of the divisions being Neoscona.  F.O. Pickard-Cambridge placed Epeira oaxacensis in Neoscona in 1904.

When found in the Galápagos, the species is often called Neoscona cooksoni and is said to be endemic, but this name is now regarded as a synonym of N. oaxacensis.

References

oaxacensis
Spiders of North America
Spiders of South America
Spiders described in 1863